Gong Min-jeung (born Kim Min-jung  on 30 September 1986) is a South Korean actress. She graduated with a Bachelor degree from the Film Art Department of Konkuk University.

She’s known for her roles in three Hong Sang-soo films, Yourself and Yours, On the Beach at Night Alone, and Grass. Also for her roles in television dramas such as Temperature of Love (2017). In her TV work, such as Familiar Wife (2018) and Sweet Munchies (2020). Her most popular role to date is Pyo Mi-seon, a dental nurse, in the rom-com TV series Hometown Cha-Cha-Cha (2021). In 2020, she won the Fantastic Best Actor Special Mention Award in the 24th Bucheon International Fantastic Film Festival for Zombie Crush: Heyri.

Career

Early career 
The first time Gong made up her mind to act was when she was in the 3rd year of middle school. A turning point in her life was watching the play, Subway Line 1. She attended Department of Film of Konkuk University in her twenties. Gong made her acting debut in 2009, in a short independent film 'Gugyeong'. Gong then made her theater acting debut in 2011 in open-run play, Rooftop Cat. After doing many minor roles, she got her first supporting role in the 2012 independent feature film Everyone Wants to Die by My Name (2013). From 2011 to 2015 she has built her reputation in a number of shorts and independent films, such as Dog, Goblin, and Ethical Street Rule.

Rising career 
Gong left a strong impression on viewers after her appearance in two Hong Sang-soo's feature films, Yourself and Yours (2016) and On the Beach at Night Alone (2017). In 2027, Gong debuted as television actress in a SBS drama series Temperature of Love (2017). In her television work Familiar Wife (2018), Gong was praise for her colorful performances. Also in 2018 Gong acted in the film The Vanished. Gong returned in another Hong Sang-soo film, Grass (2018), which premiered at the 68th Berlin International Film Festival on 16 February 2018. The film was also screened in the "Korean Cinema Today – Panorama" program of the 23rd Busan International Film Festival.

In 2019, she appeared in the much talked about women-centric film Kim Ji-young: Born 1982. Based on the novel of the same name, this feature film won many accolades, in addition to reaching 3.7 million total admissions and grossing US$27.16 million in revenue, a commercial success. In 2020, she appeared in film Zombie Crush: Heyri as Gong Jin-seon. For this role she received the Fantastic Best Actor Special Mention Award in the 24th Bucheon International Fantastic Film Festival. The same year, she appeared in the TV series Sweet Munchies and the TV series Please Don't Date Him aired in November 2020. Gong built reputation as actress with colorful performances.

On the November 17, 2020, Indie Plus at the Seoul Cinema Center announced that it would hold the "Rising Star - Actor Gong Min-jung Exhibition" from November 19 to 23. The exhibition presented 14 works in total, including 5 feature films, 7 short films with 2 sections, and 2 works recommended by Gong. The list of works were Everyone Wants to Die by My Name (2012), Yourself and Yours (2016), Grass (2017), Kim Ji-young: Born 1982 (1982), Chang Lee (2019), Call me if you need me (2018), Byeonggu (2015), Two water and a lighter (2020), Daddy’s taste (2014), Ethical street rules (2016), Coming-of-age ceremony (2018), I should have killed the bastard (2018) and recommendations from Gong include Blue Valentine (2010), and American Honey: A Song of the Wandering Star (2016).

In 2021, she was cast as Pyo Mi-seon in the comedy-drama series Hometown Cha-Cha-Cha, a remake of the 2004 South Korean film Mr. Handy, Mr. Hong.

The Korea Independent Film Association announced on November 29, 2021 that it will hold a special exhibition "Isn't it our sphere?" at the Naver Indie Theater from November 29 to December 28, 2021. The exhibition will screens 5 films of Kim Hye-jun in which Gong appears in two: Family Portrait and I Should Have Killed that Bastard.

Filmography

Film

Short film

Television

Web series

Hosting

Theater

Awards and nominations

References

External links

 
  
 Gong Min-jeung at Daum Encyclopedia 
 Gong Min-jeung at Daum Movie 
 Gong Min-jeung at PlayDB 
 Gong Min-jeung at Naver 

Living people
1986 births
Konkuk University alumni
South Korean film actresses
South Korean stage actresses
South Korean television actresses
People from Seoul
21st-century South Korean actresses